The 2003 Men's Indoor Hockey World Cup was the first edition of the Men's Indoor Hockey World Cup the quadrennial world championship for men's national indoor hockey teams organized by the International Hockey Federation.

It occurred in February 2003, in Leipzig, Germany. The host nation Germany won both the men's and women's gold medals.

The Eurosport TV channel covered the event, which had good ratings despite the late schedule. The 2015 Men's Indoor Hockey World Cup was also held in Leipzig, Germany. A total of 20 million viewers watched 13 hours broadcast on Eurosport, with ten matches broadcast on live TV. This competition included several countries which are not strong competitors at the outdoor international level.

Preliminary round

Pool A

Pool B

Finals
Semifinals

Placement rounds
Match for 11th place

Match for 9th place

Match for 7th place

Match for 5th place

Match for 3rd place

Match for 1st place

Final standings

References

Results
http://www.indoor-hockey-world-cup.de/VVI-web/IHWC2003/

External links 
 First Indoor Hockey World Cup official homepage

Indoor Hockey World Cup
World Cup
Indoor Hockey World Cup
International indoor hockey competitions hosted by Germany
Sports competitions in Leipzig
Indoor Hockey World Cup
2000s in Saxony